Hindrek Pulk (born 7 November 1990) is a retired Estonian professional volleyball player. He was a member of the Estonian national team until 2021 and represented his country at the 2019 European Volleyball Championships.

He started his professional career in club Selver Tallinn.

References

Living people
1990 births
Estonian men's volleyball players
Estonian expatriate volleyball players
Estonian expatriate sportspeople in France
Expatriate volleyball players in France